Biliphyta is a subkingdom of algae.

It includes Glaucophyta and Rhodophyta.

Members of this group should not be confused with Picobiliphytes, which are also known as "biliphytes".

References

Further reading

Algal taxonomy
Subkingdoms